Lake Orion High School is a public high school located in Orion Township, Michigan, United States. It is a part of Lake Orion Community Schools.
"Once a dragon, always a dragon." - Jeff Heath

Athletics
State Championships
 1925 - Boys' Basketball (Class E) 
 1990 - Wrestling (Class A/Division 1)
 2007 - Girls' Golf (Division 1)
 2007 - Baseball (Division 1)
 2008 - Power Lifting (Club) (Class A)
 2009 - Power Lifting (Club) (Class A)
 2010 - Football (Division 1)
 2012 - Boys' Track (Division 1)
 2018 - Girls' Volleyball (Division 1)
 2019 - Boys' Golf (Division 1)
2019 - Power Lifting (Club) (Class A)

Notable alumni

 Matthew Dear, electronic avant-pop musician
 Andrew J. Feustel, NASA astronaut
 Tom Gillis, professional golfer
 Sebastian Harris, professional soccer player
 Jeff Heath, professional football player
 Frederick Henderson, former CEO of General Motors
 Zak Keasey, former professional football player
 Jamie Milam, professional hockey player
 Troy Milam, professional hockey player
 Raymond Plouhar, staff sergeant, USMC
 Ron Tripp, World Sambo and Judo Champion; President of USA Judo
 Seth Troxler, record producer, DJ
 Cynthia Watros, actress

References

External links
Lake Orion High School website

Public high schools in Michigan
Educational institutions established in 1893
School buildings completed in 1997
High schools in Oakland County, Michigan
1893 establishments in Michigan